The Irob people (Ge'ez: ኢሮብ ʾirōb, also spelled Erob) are an ethnic group who live in a predominantly highland, mountainous area by the same name in northeastern Tigray Region, Ethiopia. They speak the Saho language. Most of them profess the catholic Christian religion and are mostly farmers. The etymology of the name Irob is debatable, but Irob's elders say that the term comes from the Saho word "Oroba", which means "welcome to our home". The boundaries of Irobland are, to an extent, identical to the Irob woreda; both are bordered by the following areas: Dabri-Mela to the north, Hado to the east, the Afar Region to the east and south, Shoumezana and Gulomakeda to the west, and Saesi Tsaedaemba to the south. The first two neighbors are Saho speakers and predominantly Muslim, the third are Muslim Afars, and the others are Tigrigna-speaking Christians.

History
  The capital (traditional center) of Irob is Alitena.  Irobs trace their lineage to one man, Summe, son of Neguse Worede-Mehret, who according to the Irob oral history, migrated to the Irobland from Tsira'e in Kilite Awla'elo, a part of Tigray, about 700 years ago.

Despite their relatively small population, the Irob have been at the forefront of regional and national politics in Ethiopia. Starting with the Zemene Mesafint, the Irob family of Shum Agame Woldu dominated Tigrayan politics. The dynasty included Dejazmach Subagadis (whose rule extended to present-day Eritrea), Shum Agame Desta, Ras Sebhat Aregawi, and many others including Emperor Yohannes IV.

During the Italian invasion, Irob patriots, led by individuals such as Dejazmach Ayele Sebhat and Dejazmach Kassa Sebhat, contributed to the anti-Italian resistance movement from their base on Mount Asimba.

In more recent times, many Irobs, such as Dr. Tesfay Debessay, who was a leader of the Ethiopian People's Revolutionary Party (EPRP), played an important role in the struggle waged against the dictatorial junta led by Colonel Mengistu Haile Mariam.

 Moreover, the Irobland proper, particularly around the Assimba and Aiga localities, served as a base for several Ethiopian revolutionary movements, including EPRP and the Tigray People's Liberation Front(TPLF). Aiga is also the location of significant battles during the Ethio-Eritrean border war (1998–2000), which ultimately led to the removal of occupying Eritrean forces from the region.

Tigray War massacre
In early January 2021 during the Tigray War at least 52 civilians (50 men, 2 women) were extrajudicially killed in Irob in their homes and backyards, according to Irob Advocacy Association, which prepared a list of the victims' names. 

Tigrai TV reported 13 victims, members of the same family thrown in a river which coloured red; relatives were denied to bury the bodies and mourn.

Lifestyle and culture

The Irob are divided into three major subgroups or Are (Houses): Adgadi-Are, Buknaiti-Are and Hasaballa. The Adgadi-Are and Hasaballa are predominantly Orthodox Christians, while Bouknaiti-Are consist of Catholics.

The Irob economy is primarily based on agriculture, including animal husbandry.  The region is also renowned for its excellent honey.  In fact, the Miess /Tej or local "Beer"(honey-wine) made from the honey is praised throughout the region for its quality.

In general, the Irob are a bicultural community.  With their Saho-speaking neighbors, they share a common language and certain social structures, such as a clan division system called Mela, and the title Ona for their regional leaders. Many other cultural practices, including wedding ceremonies, dress, dance, and food; however, are more similar to their Tigrigna-speaking neighbors specially with the peoples of Agame.

Irobs also have distinctive customs. For example, they have an elaborate poetry-telling tradition called Adar.  The Irob men have a dance/step routine called Hora and Alkafo, which was traditionally performed in preparation for battles and still commonly displayed during weddings and other ceremonies.

See also
Irob (woreda)
Agame
Saho people

References

External links
 Irob Advocacy Association: cultural and historical overview, human rights promotion

Ethnic groups in Ethiopia
Massacres committed by Eritrea
2021 in Ethiopia
Conflicts in 2021
Wars involving Eritrea
Wars involving Ethiopia
Massacres in 2021
2021 massacres of the Tigray War
January 2021 crimes in Africa
2021 murders in Ethiopia
Extrajudicial killings in Ethiopia
Mass murder in Africa
History of Ethiopia
Attacks in Ethiopia
January 2021 events in Africa